Jeunesse Sportive Groupe Bazano is a Congolese football club based in Lubumbashi, Haut-Katanga province. Founded in 2013, they currently play in the DR Congo top domestic league Linafoot. 35,000-capacity Stade Frederic Kibassa Maliba is their home venue.

References

External links
Soccerway
Club logo

Football clubs in the Democratic Republic of the Congo
Football clubs in Lubumbashi